Planet X may refer to:

Astronomy
  Planet X, a disproved hypothetical planet proposed in 1906 by Percival Lowell to have existed beyond the planet Neptune. 
  Colloquially, and by extension, any hypothetical trans-Neptunian planet, in particular Planet Nine.

Science fiction 
 Planet X, the home planet of Marvel Comics character Groot and other flora colossi
 "Planet X" (comics), a 2004 X-Men comic book story-line
 Planet X (Star Trek), a 1998 novel depicting a crossover between The X-Men and Star Trek
 The name for several Fictional planets of the Solar System
 The name for several fictional extrasolar planets
 A planet in David Ossman's 1973 sci-fi comedy album How Time Flys
 The planet Daffy Duck seeks in the cartoon Duck Dodgers in the 24½th Century.

Music 
 Planet X (Derek Sherinian album), 1999
 Planet X (Helios Creed album), 1994
 Planet-X, an album by bassist Jimmy Johnson
 Planet X (band), a progressive metal band founded by Derek Sherinian
 Plan-It-X Records, a DIY punk rocks record label

Other uses 
 Nibiru cataclysm, a supposed impending disastrous encounter between Earth and a large astronomical object
 Operation Planet X, a military operation during the Iraq War in 2003
 Planet X Limited, a British bicycle company
 Planet X Television, an action sports TV show

See also
 List of hypothetical Solar System objects
 Trans-Neptunian object
 Tenth planet (disambiguation)
 Ninth planet (disambiguation)